Edgar Meyer (born November 24, 1960) is an American bassist and composer. His styles include classical, bluegrass, newgrass, and jazz. He has won five Grammy Awards and been nominated seven times.

Meyer is a member of the Telluride Bluegrass Festival's "house band" super group, along with Sam Bush, Béla Fleck, Jerry Douglas, Stuart Duncan, and Bryan Sutton. His collaborators have spanned a wide range of musical styles and talents; among them are Joshua Bell, Hilary Hahn, Yo-Yo Ma, Jerry Douglas, Béla Fleck, Zakir Hussain, Sam Bush, Stuart Duncan, Chris Thile, Mike Marshall, Mark O'Connor, Christian McBride, and Emanuel Ax.

Early life 
Meyer grew up in Oak Ridge, Tennessee.  He learned to play the double bass from his father, Edgar Meyer Sr., who directed the string orchestra program for the local public school system. Meyer later went on to Indiana University to study with Stuart Sankey.

Career 
As a composer, Meyer's music has been premiered and recorded by Emanuel Ax, Joshua Bell, Yo-Yo Ma, the Boston Symphony Orchestra, Bela Fleck, Zakir Hussain, Hilary Hahn, and the Emerson String Quartet, among others. The Nashville Symphony and the Aspen Music Festival and School commissioned his first purely orchestral work which was premiered by the Nashville Symphony in March 2017. Additionally, Bravo! Vail and The Academy of St. Martin in the Fields commissioned an Overture for Violin and Orchestra that was premiered by Joshua Bell and ASMF in June 2017.

In 2011, Meyer collaborated on The Goat Rodeo Sessions with Yo-Yo Ma, Stuart Duncan, and Chris Thile. The album won two 2013 Grammy Awards. Meyer was honored with his fifth Grammy Award in 2015 for his Bass & Mandolin, recording with Thile. Meyer recorded a collection of Bach trios with Thile and Yo-Yo Ma, released in April 2017. In June 2020, the same group of musicians who recorded The Goat Rodeo Sessions released a second album entitled Not Our First Goat Rodeo.

Meyer is Artist in Residence at Vanderbilt University's Blair School of Music and is on faculty at the Curtis Institute of Music. At Curtis, Meyer taught Punch Brothers bassist and composer Paul Kowert.

Personal life
Edgar Meyer is married to violinist Connie (Cornelia) Heard, and they have one son, George Meyer, who also plays the violin.

Discography
Solo work
 Unfolding (1986)
 Dreams of Flight (1987)
 Love of a Lifetime (1988)
 Work in Progress (1990)
 Bach: Unaccompanied Cello Suites Performed on Double Bass (2000)
 Meyer and Bottesini Concertos (2002)
 Edgar Meyer (2006)

With Yo-Yo Ma and Mark O'Connor
 Appalachia Waltz (1996)
 Appalachian Journey (2000)
 Won Grammy Award for Best Classical Crossover Album

With Béla Fleck
 Double Time (1984, on the song "Lowdown")
 Perpetual Motion (2001)
 Won two Grammys
 "Bonnaroo Traveler" (Live at Bonnaroo 2002)
 Music for Two (live) (2004)

With Chris Thile
 Edgar Meyer and Chris Thile (2008)
 Bass & Mandolin (2014)
 Won Grammy Award for Best Contemporary Instrumental Album

Miscellaneous collaborations
 Telluride Sessions (1989) – as "Strength in Numbers"
 Skip, Hop, and Wobble (1993) – with Jerry Douglas and Russ Barenberg
 Bourbon and Rosewater (1996) – with Vishwa Mohan Bhatt and Jerry Douglas
 Schubert: Quintet, Op. 114 "The Trout" (1996) – with Emanuel Ax, Pamela Frank, Rebeca Young, and Yo-Yo Ma
 Uncommon Ritual (1997) – with Béla Fleck and Mike Marshall
 Quintet (1998) – with the Emerson String Quartet
 Short Trip Home (1999) – with Joshua Bell
 Grammy nominated
 Dawg Duos (1999) – with David Grisman
 Violin Concerto (2000) – with Saint Paul Chamber Orchestra and Hilary Hahn
 The Melody of Rhythm – Triple Concerto & Music for Trio (2009) – with Béla Fleck and Zakir Hussain
 The Goat Rodeo Sessions (2011) – with Yo-Yo Ma, Stuart Duncan and Chris Thile
 Won the Grammy Award for Best Folk Album and the Grammy Award for Best Engineered Album, Non-Classical
 Bach Trios (2017) – with Yo-Yo Ma and Chris Thile
 Not Our First Goat Rodeo (2020) – with Yo-Yo Ma, Stuart Duncan and Chris Thile

References

External links

Meyer homepage
Meyer discography
Edgar Meyer at Boosey & Hawkes
Biography at IMG Artists
BACH & friends Documentary 

1960 births
Living people
American male composers
21st-century American composers
Bluegrass musicians from Tennessee
American classical double-bassists
Male double-bassists
Aspen Music Festival and School faculty
MacArthur Fellows
Indiana University alumni
Grammy Award winners
People from Oak Ridge, Tennessee
21st-century double-bassists
21st-century American male musicians
Lyle Lovett and His Large Band members